Nueva Paz Municipal Museum is a museum located in the 15th avenue in Nueva Paz, Cuba. It was established on 14 December 1980.

The museum holds collections on history, weaponry, archeology and ethnography.

See also 
 List of museums in Cuba

References 

Museums in Cuba
Buildings and structures in Mayabeque Province
Museums established in 1980
1980 establishments in Cuba
20th-century architecture in Cuba